Charles Hare Hemphill, 1st Baron Hemphill, PC QC (August 1822 – 4 March 1908), was an Irish politician and barrister.

Career
Hemphill was born in County Tyrone, Ireland. He was the son of John and the novelist Barbara Hemphill. He was made a Queen's Counsel (QC) shortly before being appointed Solicitor-General for Ireland in 1892, a post he held until 1895. He then sat as Member of Parliament for North Tyrone from 1895 to 1906, after which he was elevated to the peerage as Baron Hemphill, of Rathkenny and of Cashel in the County of Tipperary. While most Irish Law Officers could confidently look forward to promotion to the Bench, Hemphill's age apparently ruled him out of serious consideration.

As Solicitor-General, he is remembered mainly for the somewhat malicious "compliments" paid to him by the Lord Chief Justice of Ireland, Sir Peter O'Brien, in the celebrated 1894 case of R. (Bridgeman) v. Drury. Hemphill, who appeared for Dublin Corporation, had argued, apparently with a good deal of hyperbole, that the members of the corporation were entitled to charge the ratepayers of Dublin for an especially lavish picnic. The Lord Chief Justice paid ironic tribute to Hemphill's eloquence and persuasiveness, but added drily that he had entirely failed to persuade the Court that the members of the corporation would "starve" if they were unable to make the ratepayers foot the bill for fine claret, whiskey and cigars, to say nothing of the broken wineglasses (although there were only four of them, which as the judge fairly noted, seemed quite moderate in the circumstances).

Family

Lord Hemphill married Augusta Mary, daughter of Major the Hon. Sir Francis Charles Stanhope (son of the 3rd Earl of Harrington), in 1849. They had three sons and one daughter. He died in March 1908 and was succeeded in the barony by his eldest son Stanhope Charles John Hemphill (m. the Hon May Hamilton (1879-1970), daughter of James, 9th Lord Belhaven and Stenton). He had no son and on his death, the title passed to his brother Fitzroy Hemphill, 3rd Baron Hemphill.

His daughter, Mary Hannah Augusta Hemphill, was the mother of the decorated R.A.M.C. officer and surgeon, Lt. Col. Herbert St Maur Carter, D.S.O., M.D.

Hemphill was a cousin of John Hemphill, a Chief Justice of the Texas Supreme Court, and a United States Senator, whose father was the Rev. John Hemphill from County Tyrone.

Arms

Notes

References
New Dictionary of National Biography
Kidd, Charles, Williamson, David (editors). Debrett's Peerage and Baronetage (1990 edition). New York: St Martin's Press, 1990, -

External links 

1822 births
1908 deaths
People from County Tyrone
Irish Liberal Party MPs
Barons in the Peerage of the United Kingdom
Members of the Parliament of the United Kingdom for County Tyrone constituencies (1801–1922)
Members of the Privy Council of Ireland
Solicitors-General for Ireland
UK MPs 1895–1900
UK MPs 1900–1906
UK MPs who were granted peerages
Serjeants-at-law (Ireland)
Peers created by Edward VII